UK Legislation 2013 may refer to:

List of Acts of the Parliament of the United Kingdom from 2013
List of Statutory Instruments of the United Kingdom, 2013